Jeff is a masculine name, often a short form (hypocorism) of the English given name Jefferson or Jeffrey, which comes from a medieval variant of Geoffrey.

Music 
 DJ Jazzy Jeff, American DJ/turntablist record producer Jeffrey Allen Townes
 Excision (musician), Canadian dubstep producer and DJ Jeff Abel
 Jeff Abercrombie, bassist for American rock band Fuel
 Jeff Allen, English session drummer
 Jeff Baxter, American guitarist for rock bands Steely Dan and The Doobie Brothers
 Jeff Beal (born 1963), American composer of music for various media
 Jeff Beck (1944–2023), English guitarist
 Jeff Buckley (1966–1997), American singer-songwriter
 Jeff Coffin, saxophonist, bandleader, composer and educator
 Jeff Current, lead singer of American alternative rock band Against All Will
 Jeff Fatt, Australian musician and actor, formerly with the children's band The Wiggles
 Jeff Gillan, an American journalist
 Jeff Graham, Canadian radio DJ
 Jeff Hanneman (1964–2013), American guitarist, founding member of the thrash metal band Slayer
 Jeff Hartford, Canadian DJ and producer
 Jeff Healey (1966–2008), Canadian blues-rock guitarist and songwriter 
 Jeff Loomis, lead guitarist for heavy metal band Nevermore
 Jeff Lynne, British singer-songwriter and record producer
 Jeff Mangum, American singer-songwriter and founder of Neutral Milk Hotel
 Jeff Mills, American techno DJ and producer
 Jeff Porcaro (1954–1992), American session drummer and member of the rock band Toto
 Jeff Scott Soto, American rock singer of Puerto Rican descent
 Jeff Stinco, French-Canadian singer-songwriter and lead guitarist for pop-punk band Simple Plan
 Jeff Timmons, American pop singer, producer, and pop group 98 Degrees founding member
 Jeff Todd Titon (born 1943), professor of music and author
 Jeff Tweedy, American singer-songwriter and founding member of Wilco
 Jeff Waters, Canadian thrash metal guitarist for band Annihilator

Sports 
 Jeff Abbott (baseball), American retired professional baseball player
 Jeff Abbott (racing driver), American professional motorsport drifter
 Jeff Adams, Canadian Paralympian and wheelchair sport world champion
 Jeff Adrien, former college basketball player
 Jeff Agoos (born 1968), retired Swiss-born American soccer defender
 Jeff Allam, former British racing driver
 Jeff Altenburg, American professional race car driver
 Jeff Andretti, former American race car driver
 Jeff Astle (1942–2002), English footballer
 Jeff Bagwell, Hall of Fame American baseball player
 Jeff Bes, Canadian ice hockey player
 Jeff Blake, American football player
 Jeff Burton, NASCAR racer
 Jeff Chandler (boxer), boxing champion
 Jeff Cirillo, retired baseball player
 Jeff Coetzee, South African professional tennis player
 Jeff Conine, retired baseball player
 Jeff Elliott, British decathlete and pole vaulter
 Jeff Fenech, boxer
 Jeff Ferguson (ice hockey) (born 1969), Canadian ice hockey and roller hockey goaltender
Jeff Foster (basketball) (born 1977), American basketball player
 Jeff Francis, baseball player
 Jeff Francoeur, baseball player
 Jeff Friesen, former NHL player
 Jeff Garcia, American football player
 Jeff George, American football player
 Jeff Gladney (born 1996), American football player
 Jeff Gordon, NASCAR racer
 Jeff Graham, American football player
 Jeff Graham (quarterback), American football player
 Jeff Green (basketball), American professional basketball forward
 Jeff Guiel, Canadian baseball player
 Jeff Halpern (born 1976), American NHL hockey player
 Jeff Hardy, American professional wrestler
 Jeff Holland (born 1997), American football player
 Jeff Hornacek, American basketball player
 Jeff Horton American football coach
 Jeff Jarrett, American professional wrestler
 Jeff Kent, baseball player
 Jeff Leiding, American football player
 Jeff Locke (American football), American football player
 Jeff Lockie, American football player
 Jeff Loots, American football player
 Jeff Luc, American football player
 Jeff Mills (American football), American football player
 Jeff Newman (baseball) (born 1948), American baseball player
 Jeff Nielsen, professional hockey player
 Jeff Norton, former National Hockey League player
 Jeff Okudah (born 1999), American football player
 Jeff Otis, American football player
 Jeff Overbaugh, American football player
 Jeff Pain, American-born, Canadian skeleton racer
 3.0 (professional wrestling), Canadian professional wrestler Jeff Parker
 Jeff Reed (American football), American football player
 Jeff Reed (baseball), retired baseball player
 Jeff Salzenstein (born 1973), American tennis player
 Jeff Shantz, former National Hockey League player
 Jeff Simmons (driver), American race car driver
 Jeff Skinner, Canadian National Hockey League player
 Jeff Speakman, American actor
 Jeff Stevenson (rugby league) (1932–2007), English rugby league footballer
 Jeff Stork, American volleyball player
 Charles Jeff Tesreau (1888–1946), American Major League Baseball pitcher
 Jeff Thomson, Australian cricketer
 Jeff Van Gundy, American former NBA coach and current broadcaster
 Jeff Walz (born 1971), American basketball coach
 Jeff Williams (baseball),  pitcher for the Hanshin Tigers
 Jeff Williams (cyclist), British cyclist
 Jeff Wilson (American football) (born 1995), American football player
 Jeff Wiseman (born 1950), Australian Paralympic athlete and businessman
 Jeff Withey (born 1990), American basketball player

Literature 
 Jeff Abbott, American suspense novelist
 Jeff Kinney, American game designer, cartoonist, producer, actor, and children's book author
 Jeff Koons, American artist
 Jeff Noon, British novelist, short story writer, and playwright
 Jeff Smith, American cartoonist
 Jeff VanderMeer, American writer
 Jeff Weiss, American playwright, impresario, and actor

Politics 
 Jeff Adachi, elected U.S. San Francisco Public Defender, pension reform advocate, and former San Francisco mayoral candidate
 Jeff Bingaman, junior U.S. Senator from New Mexico
 Jeff Flake, former U.S. Senator from Arizona
 Jeff Kennett, former premier of Victoria, Australia
 Jeff Sessions, former United States Attorney General and US Senator

Film and television 
 Jeff Alexander (1910–1989), American conductor, arranger, and composer of film, radio, and television scores
 Jeff Anderson, American actor
 Jeff Bennett,  American voice actor and singer
 Jeff Bergman, American voice actor
 Jeff Bollow, American writer and director
 Jeff Brazier (born 1979), English television presenter and reality TV personality
 Jeff Bridges, American actor
 Jeff Chandler (1918–1961), American film actor
 Jeff Cohen (actor), American attorney and former child actor who appeared as Chunk in the 1985 movie The Goonies
 Jeff Conaway (1950–2011), American actor
 Jeff Coopwood, American actor, singer, broadcaster and educator
 Jeff Corey (1914–2002), American stage and screen actor and director
 Jeff Corwin, American animal and nature conservationist, host of The Jeff Corwin Experience and Corwin's Quest
 Jeff Daniels, American actor
 Jeff B. Davis, American actor, comedian and singer
 Jeff Dunham, American ventriloquist and comedian
 Jeff East, American actor
 Jeff Foxworthy, American comedian and actor
 Jeff Garlin, American comedic actor
 Jeff Goldblum, American film actor
 Jeff Hunter, American film actor
 Jeff Katz, American film producer and studio executive
 Jeff Loveness, American screenwriter and television producer
 Jeff Maxwell, American actor
 Jeff McCarthy, American character actor
 Jeff "Swampy" Marsh, American television director, writer, producer, storyboard artist, and actor
 Jeff Osterhage, American film and television actor
 Jeff Probst, American television personality, host of Survivor
 Jeff Stelling, British sports journalist, sport television presenter and game show host
 Jeff Stevenson (born 1961), English actor and comedian
 Jeff Thisted, American game show host
 Jeff Wise, television journalist, producer, and author
 Jeff Yagher, American actor
 Jeff York (1912–1995), American actor

Programming 
 Jeff Dean, a senior fellow at Google and inventor of many of Google's core technologies
 Jeff Minter, British computer/video game designer and programmer
 Jeff Moss, American hacker, computer and internet security expert

Other fields
 Jeff Bezos, American entrepreneur, industrialist, media proprietor, investor, and the former chief executive officer of Amazon
 Jeff Cooper (1920–2006), United States Marine and firearms expert
 Jeff Fairburn, British businessman
 Jeff Hawkins, founder of Palm Computing and Handspring
 Jeff Kaplan, vice president of Blizzard Entertainment
 Jeff Kwatinetz, American entertainment executive
 Jeph Jacques, webcomic maker, Questionable Content
 Jeff Luers, American anarchist, environmental activist, and arsonist
 Jeff Nuttall, British 1960s counter-culture figure
 Jeff S. Shamma, professor of electrical engineering at King Abdullah University of Science and Technology
 Jeff Weise (1988–2005), American mass murderer and spree killer 
 Jeff Wooller, British accountant

Fictional characters 
 Jeff, the alter ego of Jenko in the film 22 Jump Street
 Jeff, best friend of Clarence in the 2014–17 American animated television series Clarence
 Jeff McCallister, a character in the Home Alone franchise
 Jeff, a character in the video game EarthBound
 Jeff, an enemy in the 2020 VR game Half-Life: Alyx
 Jeff Albertson, more commonly known as Comic Book Guy, from The Simpsons
 Jeff Atkins, a character in the Netflix series 13 Reasons Why
 Jeff Boomhauer, from the American television series King of the Hill
 Jeff Colby, on the American television series Dynasty and The Colbys
 Jeff Denlon, a character in the Saw franchise
 Jeff Difford, a character in Young Sheldon
 Jeff Fungus, a character and voiced by Frank Oz in the Monsters, Inc. franchise
 Jeff Heaney, a recurring character in the sitcom Peep Show
 Jeff Isaacs, a character in Degrassi: The Next Generation
 Jeff K., a character on the Something Awful comedy website
 Jeff the Killer, a character from the creepypasta of the same name
 Jeff Murdock, a main character in the first three seasons of the British sitcom Coupling
 Jeff Suckler, a minor character in the FX series What We Do In The Shadows
 Jeff Thompkins, title character in the 2011 comedy-drama film Jeff, Who Lives at Home
 Jeff Winger, main character in the NBC sitcom Community

As a surname 

 Janina Jeff, American geneticist
 Sandra Jeff, New Mexico politician

See also
Jef, short form of Josef/Jozef

References 

English masculine given names
Lists of people by given name
Hypocorisms